The Jan Długosz Award (Polish: Nagroda im. Jana Długosza) is a Polish literary prize which has been presented annually since 1998 during the Kraków Book Fair. It is named in honor of Polish medieval chronicler Jan Długosz (1415–1480) and its aim is to popularize works in the field of humanities written by Polish authors and published the previous year which make significant contributions to the advancement of science and cultural enrichment. The award recognizes books not only targeted to the professional, scientific circles but also to the general reader, which is intended to make them the subject of a broader public debate. The winners of the award receive cash prizes and a statuette designed by sculptor Bronisław Chromy.'''

List of Laureates

See also 
Gall Anonim
Wincenty Kadłubek
History of Poland

References 

Science writing awards
Polish literary awards
Awards established in 1998